Wallingford  may refer to:

Places
 Wallingford, Oxfordshire, England, United Kingdom
Wallingford Castle the castle
 Wallingford, Connecticut, United States
 Wallingford, Iowa, United States
 Wallingford, Kentucky, United States
 Wallingford, Pennsylvania, United States
 Wallingford, Seattle, United States
 Wallingford, Vermont, United States, a town
 Wallingford (CDP), Vermont, a census-designated place in the town
 Wallingford station (disambiguation), stations of the name

Administrative units
 Municipal Borough of Wallingford
 Wallingford Rural District
 Wallingford (UK Parliament constituency), a former constituency, abolished in 1885

People
 Brian of Wallingford, also known as Brien FitzCount
 Ealdgyth of Wallingford, wife of Robert D'Oyly
 Jesse Wallingford (1872–1944), British sport shooter
 John of Wallingford (d. 1214), English monk and abbot of St. Albans abbey
 John of Wallingford (d. 1258), English monk and chronicler
 Miles of Wallingford, also known as Miles Crispin
 Phoebe Tyler Wallingford
 Richard of Wallingford (constable)
 Richard of Wallingford (mathematician)
 Wallingford Riegger
 Wayne Wallingford, American politician
 William of Wallingford